Uxatindar ("oxen peaks") is a mountain ridge with three peaks in the southern Highlands of Iceland by the craters of Laki and the Skaftá river.

References

Mountains of Iceland